Julian Thomas Page (born 1 May 1954) is an English former first-class cricketer.

Page was born in the Bristol suburb of Clifton. He later studied at the University of Cambridge, attending Sidney Sussex College. While studying at Cambridge, Page played first-class cricket twice for Cambridge University in 1974, against Leicestershire and Nottinghamshire. In addition to playing first-class cricket in 1974, Page also made two appearances in List A one-day cricket, making one appearance each for Cambridge University against Kent in the Benson & Hedges Cup and for Gloucestershire against Lancashire in the John Player League.

References

External links

1954 births
Living people
People from Clifton, Bristol
Alumni of Sidney Sussex College, Cambridge
English cricketers
Cambridge University cricketers
Gloucestershire cricketers